The first season of the American television series Supergirl, which is based on the DC Comics character Supergirl / Kara Zor-El, a costumed superheroine who is the cousin to Superman and one of the last surviving Kryptonians.

Supergirl was ordered to series in May 2015, and later picked up for a full season in November 2015, with filming taking place primarily in Los Angeles. Melissa Benoist stars in the titular role, and is joined by principal cast members Mehcad Brooks, Chyler Leigh, Jeremy Jordan, David Harewood, and Calista Flockhart.

The series premiere was watched by 12.96 million viewers, tied with NBC's Blindspot as the top-rated series premiere of the 2015–16 fall season. The season, which premiered on CBS on October 26, 2015, and ran until April 18, 2016, over 20 episodes, overall received positive reviews. The series was renewed for a second season on May 12, 2016, and moved to The CW.

Episodes

Cast and characters

Main
 Melissa Benoist as Kara Zor-El / Kara Danvers / Supergirl
 Mehcad Brooks as James Olsen
 Chyler Leigh as Alex Danvers
 Jeremy Jordan as Winslow "Winn" Schott, Jr.
 David Harewood as J'onn J'onzz / Martian Manhunter and Hank Henshaw
 Calista Flockhart as Cat Grant

Recurring
 Laura Benanti as Astra In-Ze and Alura Zor-El
 Dean Cain as Jeremiah Danvers
 Jenna Dewan-Tatum as Lucy Lane
 Peter Facinelli as Maxwell Lord
 Brit Morgan as Leslie Willis / Livewire
 Glenn Morshower as Sam Lane
 Italia Ricci as Siobhan Smythe / Silver Banshee
 Helen Slater as Eliza Danvers
 Chris Vance as Non
 Laura Vandervoort as Indigo
 Briana Venskus as Vasquez

Guest

The hosts of The Talk, Sara Gilbert, Julie Chen, Sharon Osbourne, Aisha Tyler and Sheryl Underwood, cameo as themselves.

Production

Development
By September 2014, Warner Bros. Television was looking to create a television series centered around Kara Zor-El / Supergirl. Executive producers for the series include Greg Berlanti (also a creator/producer for Arrow and The Flash), Ali Adler, who were both writing the script, and Berlanti Productions' Sarah Schechter. DC Comics' Geoff Johns was also expected to be part of the project. Titles under consideration for the series included Super and Girl. Berlanti confirmed the show shortly after, and stated it was in development and had yet to be pitched to networks. On September 20, it was announced that CBS had landed Supergirl with a series commitment, with an expected premiere in 2015 of the 2015–16 television season.

The show was officially picked up to series on May 6, 2015. On November 30, 2015, CBS ordered an additional seven episodes of Supergirl, for a full season of 20 episodes.

Writing 
In January 2015, CBS Entertainment chairwoman Nina Tassler revealed the show would be a procedural, saying, "There will be [crime] cases, but what [executive producers] Ali Adler and Greg Berlanti pitched was a real series arc for her. The beauty of it is now with shows like The Good Wife and Madam Secretary, you can have serialized story elements woven into a case of the week. She's a crime solver, so she's going to have to solve a crime." In July 2015, Adler spoke on how much influence Superman would have on the show, saying, "Our prototype is the way the president is seen on Veep. It's certainly [inspired by] so much of what Julia Louis-Dreyfus' character goes through. Ultimately, this is a show about Supergirl and we really want to see it through her lens."

Casting
For the role of Kara Zor-El / Supergirl, the producers wanted a Caucasian actress aged between 22 and 26 years. In January 2015, it was announced by The Hollywood Reporter that Melissa Benoist would star as the character. Benoist later revealed that auditioning for the part "was a long, drawn-out, three-month process"; she was the first actress looked at for the role, although Claire Holt and Gemma Atkinson were also considered. In the same month, Mehcad Brooks was cast as James Olsen, based on the character Jimmy Olsen. Unlike the comics, where the same character is portrayed as a Caucasian and goes by "Jimmy", this version is African-American and goes by "James". Brooks described this as a form of "intermixing of races", differing from the 1940s where "white things were white, black things were black. Latino things were Latino". In February, Chyler Leigh was cast as Alex Danvers, an original creation for the series. In the same month, David Harewood and Calista Flockhart were cast as Hank Henshaw and Cat Grant, respectively. It was eventually revealed that Harewood's character was actually J'onn J'onzz / Martian Manhunter impersonating Henshaw. In March, Jeremy Jordan was cast as Winslow "Winn" Schott. The character was written for the series as the son of Winslow Schott / Toyman, unlike the comics where Toyman's son is Anton Schott.

Filming
In February 2015, it was announced that Andrew Kreisberg, co-creator of Arrow and The Flash, had joined the series as a writer and executive producer; and Arrow / The Flash and Smallville alum Glen Winter was announced to be directing the pilot. Principal photography for the pilot took place from March 4 to March 29, 2015. Filming locations included the Warner Bros. lot, where Lois and Clark was shot. Each episode cost approximately $3 million to broadcast, which is one of the highest license fees ever for a first year show. Filming wrapped in March 2016.

Music
The score for the season was composed by Blake Neely.

Release

Broadcast 
The season began airing on CBS on October 26, 2015, and ended on April 18, 2016. The season premiered on October 29, 2015, in the United Kingdom on Sky One. The series premiered in Australia on December 6, 2015, on FOX8. In Canada, Supergirl aired in a sim-subbed simulcast on Global with the American broadcast in the season.

Home media

Reception

Ratings

Critical response 
The review aggregator website Rotten Tomatoes reported a 92% approval rating with an average rating of 7.53/10 based on 71 reviews. The website's consensus reads, "Melissa Benoist shines as Superman's plucky little cousin in Supergirl, a family-friendly comic-book adaptation that ditches cynicism for heart." Metacritic, which uses a weighted average, assigned a score of 75 out of 100 based on 33 reviews, indicating "generally favorable reviews". Max Nicholson of IGN gave the season a score of 7.3 out of 10, along with the verdict, "While Supergirl's first season disappointed in several key areas -- namely its villains and romantic subplots -- Supergirl herself was spot-on, and the story offered several surprising twists (e.g., Hank Henshaw as J'onn J'onzz). Yes, not all episodes were winners, but when the series flew, it soared, especially in terms of emotional impact." Reviewing the season as a whole, Colin Campbell of Polygon criticized the costumes, fight sequences, the ludicrous villains, the predictable nature of the plot, and felt that the title character was not "Super enough", but noted that "unless your interest is in seeing yet another comic-book franchise transferred reverently to the screen they're of only marginal concern." Evan Valentine of Collider ranked Supergirl eighth in his list of the worst and best superhero television series of 2015 and wrote, "Aside from presenting the best Supergirl we’ve seen in live action with Melissa Benoist [...] it managed to capture a sense of fun among the cast that was infectious."

Accolades 

|-
! scope="row" rowspan="1" | 2015
| Critics' Choice Television Awards
| Most Exciting New Series
| Supergirl
| 
| 
|-
! scope="row" rowspan="7" | 2016
| People's Choice Awards
| Favorite New TV Drama
| Supergirl
| 
| 
|-
| Teen Choice Awards
| Breakout Series
| Supergirl
| 
| 
|-
| rowspan="5" | Saturn Awards
| Best Actress on Television
| Melissa Benoist
| 
| 
|-
| Best Guest Starring Role on Television
| Laura Benanti
| 
| 
|-
| Best Superhero Adaptation Television Series
| Supergirl
| 
| 
|-
| Best Supporting Actress on Television
| Calista Flockhart
| 
| 
|-
| Breakthrough Performance
| Melissa Benoist
| 
| 
|}

Notes

References

External links 
 
 

2015 American television seasons
2016 American television seasons
Supergirl (TV series) seasons